Vanishing Twin are a London-based psychedelic pop quintet, founded in 2015. The group is led by singer and guitarist Cathy Lucas, also a member of Fanfarlo, and have released three albums: Choose Your Own Adventure (2016),  The Age of Immunology (2019), and Ookii Gekkou (2021). The band's name refers to the fetal absorption of Lucas's twin during pregnancy.

The band consists of Cathy Lucas on vocals, Valentina Magaletti on drums (whose credits include Bat for Lashes and Gruff Rhys’ Neon Neon project), bassist Susumu Mukai (aka Zongamin), with Phil M.F.U. (Man From Uranus) on "strange sounds" and filmmaker/visual artist Elliott Arndt on flute and percussion. Lucas was previously a member of Fanfarlo. "The group’s cosmopolitan membership initially reflected its mission to synthesize psychedelic traditions around the globe, from tropicalía to kosmische rock." Their sound has been compared to the band Stereolab and is described as Brazilian psych-jazz as well as a psychedelic, experimental pop ensemble.

In 2016 their debut album, Choose Your Own Adventure, was released on Soundway Records. In 2017, they released the EP Dream By Numbers. Their second album, The Age of Immunology, was released in 2019 on Fire Records. On 15 October 2021 they released their third album, Ookii Gekkou, again on Fire Records.

Discography
Albums
 Choose Your Own Adventure (2016)
 The Age of Immunology (2019)
 Ookii Gekkou (2021)

EPs
 Dream by Numbers (2017)

References

External links

Musical groups from London
Musical groups established in 2015
English indie rock groups
2015 establishments in England